Inlogov, founded in 1964, is the Institute of Local Government Studies at the University of Birmingham in the United Kingdom. It is a centre for the applied study of local and community governance. It has 11 academic staff members, 15 practitioner/academic associates.  INLOGOV is currently home to 450 postgraduates studying master's degrees or postgraduate certificates and 15 PhD students.

INLOGOV’s research spans four key themes:

 Governance, institutional design and leadership
 Co-production, democratic and social innovation, and inclusion  
 Policy-making, implementation and service delivery
 Smart, sustainable and creative approaches to policy challenges

Leadership

The current director is Jason Lowther (https://www.linkedin.com/in/jasonlowther/)

External links
 INLOGOV Website
 University of Birmingham, UK
 Blog : https://inlogov.com/

University of Birmingham